Haleiwa is a North Shore community and census-designated place (CDP) in the Waialua District of the island of Oahu, City and County of Honolulu.
Haleiwa is located on Waialua Bay, the mouth of Anahulu Stream (also known as Anahulu River). A small boat harbor is located here, and the shore of the bay is surrounded by Haleiwa Beach Park (north side) and Haleiwa Alii Beach Park (south side). Further west from the center of town is Kaiaka State Recreation Area on Kiaka Point beside Kaiaka Bay. As of the 2020 census, the CDP had a population of 4,941. The 2018 estimate was 4,040. It is the largest commercial center on the North Shore of the island. Its old plantation town character is preserved in many of the buildings, making this a popular destination for tourists and residents alike, visiting surfing and diving sites along the north shore.

The U.S. postal code for Haleiwa, including Kawailoa, is 96712.

Geography 
Haleiwa is located at 21°35'24" North, 158°6'50" West (21.590050, -158.113928), southwest along Kamehameha Highway (State route 83) from Pūpūkea. At Haleiwa, Kamehameha Highway becomes state route 99 (at the traffic circle known as "Weed Circle"), which runs eastward up across the Oahu central plateau to Wahiawā. A new bypass route (Joseph P. Leong Highway) avoids both the traffic circle and Haleiwa, extending state route 83 to just north of Haleiwa town.  Haleiwa Road and both Kaukonahua Road and Waialua Beach Road from Weed Circle go south and southwest into Waialua across Paukauila Stream.

The historic Rainbow Bridge over the Anahulu River marks the northern entrance to old Haleiwa Town. There you will find small shops, eateries and many galleries. Two beach parks surround the small boat harbor located in Waialua Bay, Haleiwa Beach Park located to the north and Haleiwa Alii Beach Park located to the south.

The total area is 23.67% water.

History
In 1898 a businessman named Benjamin Dillingham opened a hotel in the North Shore area and named it Haleiwa. In the Hawaiian language, hale means "house", and the iwa is a frigatebird. He also built a railway line from Honolulu to Waialua along the west coast around Kaena Point, which opened the same year and ended in front of his hotel. The railroad inaugurated a passenger train, the Haleiwa Limited, which took two hours for this trip. This railroad was chartered as the Oahu Railway & Land Company. 
 
Haleiwa was designated a State Historic, Cultural and Scenic District in 1984 by the City and County of Honolulu. All new buildings must adhere to a design plan that reflects the territorial architecture of Haleiwa's earlier sugar industry period. The town is home to 30 historic buildings featuring plantation architectural styles influenced by the Waialua Sugar Co.

Military
The 16th Coast Artillery's Battery F was assigned to four 8-inch M1888 railway guns that were located nearby on specially made spurs. These railway guns were soon dismounted and designated as Battery Kahuku. On December 7, 1941, two P-40B fighters, piloted by George Welch and Kenneth M. Taylor, managed to scramble against the Japanese attack on Pearl Harbor, taking off from the now-abandoned Haleiwa Airfield.

Demographics 

As of the 2000 Census, there were 2,225 people, 770 households, and 525 families residing in the CDP. The population density was then 469.4/km2 (1,218.1/mi2). The racial makeup of the CDP was 24.63% White, 0.49% Black or African American, 0.31% Native American, 28.85% Asian, 9.98% Pacific Islander, 0.81% from other races, and 34.92% from two or more races.  10.29% of the population were Hispanic or Latino of any race.

There were 770 households, out of which 28.8% had children under the age of 18 living with them, 45.7% were married couples living together, 14.4% had a female householder with no husband present, and 31.7% were non-families. 24.4% of all households were made up of individuals, and 8.7% had someone living alone who was 65 years of age or older.  The average household size was 2.88 and the average family size was 3.46.

In the CDP the population was spread out, with 26.2% under the age of 18, 9.7% from 18 to 24, 27.2% from 25 to 44, 24.6% from 45 to 64, and 12.3% who were 65 years of age or older.  The median age was 36 years.  For every 100 females, there were 103.6 males.  For every 100 females age 18 and over, there were 101.1 males.

The median income for a household in the CDP was $39,643, and the median income for a family was $48,553. Males had a median income of $31,750 versus $25,163 for females. The per capita income for the CDP was $16,504.  17.6% of the population and 15.0% of families were below the poverty line.  Out of the total population, 26.2% of those under the age of 18 and 6.7% of those 65 and older were living below the poverty line.

Education
The Hawaii Department of Education operates public schools. Haleiwa Elementary School is in the CDP.

Sunset Beach Elementary School has a Haleiwa address and is in the Pupukea CDP.

Attractions
Matsumoto's Shave Ice, a local island favorite, is located in Haleiwa town and sells Oahu's most popular shave ice. It has been open for over half a century, and is open seven days a week from 9:00AM to 6:00PM.

"Haleiwa Beach Park provides a plethora of possibilities including surfing lessons which are offered year round by Uncle Bryan's Sunset Suratt Surf School and the North Shore Surf Girls and walking distance from shopping, eating and sightseeing in historic Haleiwa Town." "Hale'iwa Beach Park" on 21 
November 2012
 
Several of the beaches less popular with traditional surfers are becoming well known for foil surfing due to the strong surfing community and year-round interest in water sports.

Haleiwa Harbor is also a popular destination for stand-up paddle boarding.

Winter months bring large waves to Haleiwa. Surf tourism is a popular attraction in Haleiwa.

References

External links

Census-designated places in Honolulu County, Hawaii
Populated places on Oahu
Historic districts in Hawaii
Populated places established in 1898
1898 establishments in Hawaii
Populated coastal places in Hawaii